Beit al-Mamlouka is a luxury boutique hotel located in the old city of Damascus, Syria. It was established in 2005 in the city's oldest borough, the Christian quarter of Bab Touma ("St. Thomas' Gate").

The hotel is a restoration of a 17th-century Damascene house and offers 8 different rooms each named after a famous historic figure of Arab or Muslim history, like Averroes and Baybars. There are original paintings and features from the 18th century, together with a mid 16th century archway and a 200-year Christian fresco.

References

External links
Al-Mamlouka, the hotel website
Beit Al-Mamlouka, Damascus: Where to stay, a review in the travel section of The Telegraph
Boutique City Hotels: Al Mamlouka - Damascus, Syria - Luxury Boutique Hotel, description in Luxury Travel Magazine
Enjoy the truest culture of the Arab world with Al Mamlouka Hotel, Syria, a review in Hotel & Resort Insider

Hotels in Damascus
Old Damascene houses
Buildings and structures inside the walled city of Damascus
2005 establishments in Syria